Bishr ibn al-Ḥārith better known as Bishr al-Ḥāfī (Bishr the Barefoot) was a Muslim saint born near Merv in about 767 C.E. He converted and studied Muslim tradition under Al-Fozail ibn Iyaz. Bishr became famous as one of the greatest saints in the area.

Biography
Bishr was born in Merv and settled at Baghdad
where he spent his nights and days in impudence.

Conversion 
One story of his conversion involves Musa al-Kadhim, who once happened to pass by his house in Baghdad. He saw a slave girl coming out of his house and asked her whether the owner of the house was a free man or a servant. She told him he was free. Musa al-Kadhim told her she was right, because "if he was a servant, he would fear his Lord".

When the slave girl came back into the house, she gave Bishr an account of what took place between her and al-Kadhim. It is said that Bishr quickly jumped to his feet and headed to the door barefooted, but the pious man had already left. He left in pursuit of the man and when he finally caught up with him asked him to repeat his words and he obliged. Bishr was so taken aback by his words that he fell to the ground and began to cry, saying "No, I am a slave, I am a slave!"

From then onwards he walked without shoes and people began calling him Bishr al-Haafi (The barefooted one). When asked why he did not wear shoes, he would reply "My master Allah guided me when I was barefooted, and I will remain in this condition till death".

Another story of his conversion was anarrated by Attar in the Memorial of the Saints. Attar narrated that Bishr had lived a life of dissipation, and one day, as he was staggering along the road drunk, he found a piece of paper on which was written, “In the Name of God, the Merciful, the Compassionate.” Bishr is said to have bought an attar of roses and perfumed the paper with it, and then deposited it reverently in his house. That night a venerable man had a dream in which he was bidden to tell Bishr:

The venerable man was perplexed by the dream, as he knew Bishr to be dissolute, so he went back to sleep. However, the man had the same dream two more times during that night and, after rising in the morning, went in search of Bishr to tell him of the dreams. The venerable man found Bishr at a drunken party but warned him that he had a message from God and told Bishr of his dreams. Bishr immediately understood the man and told his companions:

Attar further narrated that from that day onwards, Bishr lived in so saintly a fashion that few equaled him in righteousness. One of Bishr's customs, Attar narrates, was to walk barefoot wherever he went and as such he earned the name "Bishr the Barefoot".

He was also known to be an acquaintance of Ahmad al-Muhajir, the grandson of Jafar Al-Sadiq.

Education 
To learn hadiths, Bishr travelled to Kufa, Basra and Mecca. He learned hadiths from individuals such as Hamad b. Zayd, 'Abd Allah b. Mubarak, Malik b. Anas and Abu Bakr al-'Ayyash. He also learned from Ibrahim b. Sa'd al-Zuhri, Sharik b. 'Abd Allah, al-Fudayl b. Ayaz and Ali b. Khushram (uncle of Bishr). People including Abu Khuthayma, Zuhayr b. Harb, Sirri al-Saqati, 'Abbas b. 'Abd al-'Azim and Muhammad b. Hatam transmitted hadiths from him.

See also
 Ali al-Uraidhi ibn Ja'far al-Sadiq

References

760s births
People from Merv
8th-century people from the Abbasid Caliphate
841 deaths
Islamic philosophers
Muslim saints